South Wales is a hamlet in the towns of Aurora and Wales in Erie County, New York, United States.

WGRZ's broadcast tower and in-house weather radar are based in the hamlet.

The Gow School is located in South Wales.

Notable people
Wally Schang, former baseball catcher and member of the New York Yankees' first World Series title team in 1923.
Frank Wright, Olympic sport shooter

References

Hamlets in New York (state)
Hamlets in Erie County, New York